Chang Sheng-ford (born 1 September 1949) is a Taiwanese politician. He was the Minister of Finance of the Republic of China from 2012 to 2016.

ROC Finance Ministry

Cross-strait finance

In early April 2013, Chang said that representative from banks in Mainland China may soon be able to join the board of directors in Taiwanese financial institutions. However, this is only feasible if they do not exercise undue influence on management of the companies. He views this as merely a form of investment.

See also
 Economy of the Republic of China

References

1949 births
Living people
Taiwanese Ministers of Finance
Politicians of the Republic of China on Taiwan from Taipei
National Taiwan University alumni
National Chengchi University alumni
Kuomintang politicians in Taiwan